Epipsestis is a genus of moths belonging to the subfamily Thyatirinae of the Drepanidae. It was erected by Shōnen Matsumura in 1921.

Species
Species group ornata
Epipsestis manmiaoyangi László & Ronkay, 1999
Epipsestis ornata (Leech, [1889])
Species group nikkoensis
Epipsestis nikkoensis (Matsumura, 1921)
Species group castaneata
Epipsestis bilineata (Warren, 1915) (=Epipsestis acutangula (Warren, 1915))
Epipsestis castaneata (Warren, 1915)
Epipsestis peregovitsi Laszlo & G. Ronkay, 2000
Species group dubia
Epipsestis albicosta Yoshimoto, 1993
Epipsestis albidisca (Warren, 1888)
Epipsestis dubia (Warren, 1888)
Epipsestis longipennis Yoshimoto, 1982
Epipsestis medialis Yoshimoto, 1982
Epipsestis mediofusca Yoshimoto, 1982
Epipsestis meilingchani László & Ronkay, 1999
Epipsestis niveifasciata Laszlo & G. Ronkay, 2000
Epipsestis witti Laszlo, G. Ronkay & L. Ronkay, 2007
Species group vastaguncus
Epipsestis vastaguncus Laszlo & G. Ronkay, 2000
Species group nigropunctata
Epipsestis bisociata Laszlo & G. Ronkay, 2000
Epipsestis nigropunctata (Sick, 1941)
Epipsestis stueningi Yoshimoto, 1988
Species group cortigera
Epipsestis cortigera Yoshimoto, 1995
Epipsestis wernyi Laszlo, G. Ronkay, L. Ronkay & Witt, 2007
Species group renalis
Epipsestis renalis (Moore, 1888)

Former species
Epipsestis griseata (Warren, 1915)
Epipsestis orbicularis (Moore, 1888)

References

Thyatirinae
Drepanidae genera
Taxa named by Shōnen Matsumura